Campo Municipal de Gobela is the home stadium of Arenas Club de Getxo, Getxo with a 2,000 capacity.

History
Arenas played at the Campo de Ibaiondo between September 1925 & May 1943. They were forced to sell the Campo de Ibaiondo and played at a number of stadiums in the Bilbao area over the next four seasons. The Campo de Gobela opened on 27 September 1947 with a league fixture against CA Osasuna (0-0).
The stadium was rebuilt in 2004.

Links
Estadios de España

References

Getxo
Football venues in the Basque Country (autonomous community)
Arenas Club de Getxo
Sports venues completed in 1947